Daniel Bedoya Velez (born 13 February 1994) is a Colombian professional footballer who plays for FC Tucson  in USL League One.

Early life
Bedoya was born in Medellin, Colombia, his family moved to Queens, New York in 2002.

Career

Youth and college
Bedoya played varsity soccer for Francis Lewis High School in Queens, New York. He then played for the New York Red Bulls Academy since 2011 and was a member of the U-18 squad. Bedoya also played  college soccer for St. John's University from 2012  to 2013. While with the Red Storm he played in 36 matches scoring 3 goals and recording 5 assists.

During the 2014 season Bedoya played for the New York Red Bulls U-23 in the National Premier Soccer League.  He helped the team capture the 2014 NPSL title appearing as a starter in the league final. He also played with the U23s in the U.S. Open Cup.

Professional
Bedoya signed with New York Red Bulls II on April 3, 2015. On April 12, 2015, he made his debut with the club, coming on as first-half substitute in a match against Wilmington Hammerheads FC. On July 18, 2015, Bedoya scored his first professional goal in a 2–0 victory over Harrisburg City Islanders. On July 25, 2015, Bedoya scored his second goal of the season for New York in a 4–2 victory over Richmond Kickers.  On September 5, 2015 Bedoya scored on a 22-yard free kick, helping New York to a 3–2 victory over Louisville City FC. On September 26, 2015, Bedoya scored one goal and assisted on another during extra time to help New York Red Bulls II to a 4–2 victory over Pittsburgh Riverhounds, advancing New York in the 2015 USL Playoffs.

In 2017 Bedoya joined Long Island Rough Riders in the Premier Development League. While with the club he appeared in 21 league matches and scored 4 goals. After impressing in a scrimmage against New York City FC, Bedoya was signed by the  Major League Soccer side on August 9, 2018.

On 18 July 2019, Bedoya was loaned to USL Championship side Hartford Athletic for the remainder of the season.

Bedoya was released by New York City at the end of the 2019 season.
On January 1 Bedoya was transferred by NYCFC to Dominican Republic team Atlético Pantoja of the Liga Dominicana de Fútbol. On March 7, Bedoya and the team won the leagues Super cup.

Bedoya moved to National Independent Soccer Association club New Amsterdam FC on August 20. He appeared in all four of the team's regular season matches during the Fall 2020 season, and played in all three playoff matches during the Fall Championship tournament.

On March 2, 2021, Bedoya returned to the USL when he was signed by FC Tucson of USL League One.

References

External links
Red Storm's bio

 
MLS player profile

1994 births
Living people
American soccer players
Association football midfielders
Colombian emigrants to the United States
Colombian footballers
St. John's Red Storm men's soccer players
New York Red Bulls U-23 players
New York Red Bulls II players
Long Island Rough Riders players
New York City FC players
Hartford Athletic players
Atlético Pantoja players
New Amsterdam FC players
FC Tucson players
Sportspeople from Queens, New York
Soccer players from New York City
USL League Two players
Major League Soccer players
USL Championship players
USL League One players
National Independent Soccer Association players
Footballers from Medellín
Colombian expatriate footballers
Colombian expatriates in the Dominican Republic
Expatriate footballers in the Dominican Republic